Nathan Shiffman (born December 9, 1991) is an American professional soccer player and entrepreneur.

Career

Early career
Shiffman played college soccer at Virginia Commonwealth University between 2010 and 2013. While at college he also appeared for USL PDL club Fredericksburg Hotspur in 2012.

Professional
Shiffman signed his first professional contract with USL Pro club Oklahoma City Energy on February 4, 2014. In his first season, Shiffman was a regular starter, playing in 22 of the 28 USL Pro matches. Ahead of the 2015 season, Shiffman signed with his hometown team, the Richmond Kickers on a one-year deal.

References

1991 births
Living people
American soccer players
VCU Rams men's soccer players
Fredericksburg Hotspur players
OKC Energy FC players
Richmond Kickers players
RVA FC players
Association football midfielders
Soccer players from Richmond, Virginia
USL League Two players
USL Championship players
Sportspeople from Richmond, Virginia